Sheshtaraz District is a district (bakhsh) in Khalilabad County, Razavi Khorasan province, Iran. At the 2006 census, its population was 18,223, in 5,022 families.  The District has one city: Kondor. The District has two rural districts (dehestan): Kavir Rural District and Sheshtaraz Rural District.

References 

Districts of Razavi Khorasan Province
Khalilabad County